Ganthela is a genus of spiders in the family Liphistiidae. It was first described in 2015 by Xu & Kuntner. , it contains 7 species, all of them from China.

Species
Ganthela comprises the following species:
Ganthela cipingensis (Wang, 1989)
Ganthela jianensis Xu, Kuntner & Chen, 2015
Ganthela qingyuanensis Xu, Kuntner & Liu, 2015
Ganthela venus Xu, 2015
Ganthela wangjiangensis Xu, Kuntner & Liu, 2015
Ganthela xianyouensis Xu, Kuntner & Chen, 2015
Ganthela yundingensis Xu, 2015

References

Liphistiidae
Mesothelae genera
Spiders of China